Talmi is a Jewish surname. People with the surname include:

 Emma Talmi (1905–2004), Israeli politician 
 Igal Talmi (born 1925), Israeli nuclear physicist
 Meir Talmi (1909–1994), Israeli politician
 Yoav Talmi (born 1943), Israeli conductor and composer

See also
 Talmi-Teshub, Hittite viceroy of Carchemish
 Talmy, list of people with a similar surname

Jewish surnames